CITK-FM is a First Nations community radio station that operates at 89.9 MHz (FM) in Obedjiwan, Quebec, Canada.

Owned by Corporation Tepatcimo Kitotakan, the station received CRTC approval in 1994.

References

External links
CITK FM

Itk